A card game is any game using playing cards as the primary device with which the game is played, be they traditional or game-specific. Countless card games exist, including families of related games (such as poker). A small number of card games played with traditional decks have formally standardized rules with international tournaments being held, but most are folk games whose rules may vary by region, culture, location or from circle to circle.

Traditional card games are played with a deck or pack of playing cards which are identical in size and shape. Each card has two sides, the face and the back. Normally the backs of the cards are indistinguishable. The faces of the cards may all be unique, or there can be duplicates. The composition of a deck is known to each player. In some cases several decks are shuffled together to form a single pack or shoe. Modern card games usually have bespoke decks, often with a vast amount of cards, and can include number or action cards. This type of game is generally regarded as part of the board game hobby.

Games using playing cards exploit the fact that cards are individually identifiable from one side only, so that each player knows only the cards they hold and not those held by anyone else. For this reason card games are often characterized as games of chance or "imperfect information"—as distinct from games of strategy or perfect information, where the current position is fully visible to all players throughout the game. Many games that are not generally placed in the family of card games do in fact use cards for some aspect of their gameplay.

Some games that are placed in the card game genre involve a board. The distinction is that the gameplay of a card game chiefly depends on the use of the cards by players (the board is a guide for scorekeeping or for card placement), while board games (the principal non-card game genre to use cards) generally focus on the players' positions on the board, and use the cards for some secondary purpose.

Types

Trick-taking games

The object of a trick-taking game is based on the play of multiple rounds, or tricks, in each of which each player plays a single card from their hand, and based on the values of played cards one player wins or "takes" the trick. The specific object varies with each game and can include taking as many tricks as possible, taking as many scoring cards within the tricks won as possible, taking as few tricks (or as few penalty cards) as possible, taking a particular trick in the hand, or taking an exact number of tricks. Bridge, Whist and Spades, and the various Tarot card games, are popular examples.

Matching games

The object of a matching (or sometimes "melding") game is to acquire particular groups of matching cards before an opponent can do so. In Rummy, this is done through drawing and discarding, and the groups are called melds. Mahjong is a very similar game played with tiles instead of cards. Non-Rummy examples of match-type games generally fall into the "fishing" genre and include the children's games Go Fish and Old Maid.

Shedding games

In a shedding game, players start with a hand of cards, and the object of the game is to be the first player to discard all cards from one's hand. Common shedding games include Crazy Eights (commercialized by Mattel as Uno) and Daihinmin. Some matching-type games are also shedding-type games; some variants of Rummy such as Paskahousu, Phase 10, Rummikub, the bluffing game I Doubt It, and the children's games Musta Maija and Old Maid, fall into both categories.

Catch and collect games

The object of an accumulating game is to acquire all cards in the deck. Examples include most War type games, and games involving slapping a discard pile such as Slapjack. Egyptian Ratscrew has both of these features.

Fishing games
 

In fishing games, cards from the hand are played against cards in a layout on the table, capturing table cards if they match.  Fishing games are popular in many nations, including China, where there are many diverse fishing games.  Scopa is considered one of the national card games of Italy.  Cassino is the only fishing game to be widely played in English-speaking countries. Zwicker has been described as a "simpler and jollier version of Cassino", played in Germany. Tablanet (tablić) is fishing-style game popular in Balkans.

Comparing games

Comparing card games are those where hand values are compared to determine the winner, also known as "vying" or "showdown" games. Poker, blackjack, mus, and baccarat are examples of comparing card games. As seen, nearly all of these games are designed as gambling games.

Patience and solitaire games

Solitaire games are designed to be played by one player. Most games begin with a specific layout of cards, called a tableau, and the object is then either to construct a more elaborate final layout, or to clear the tableau and/or the draw pile or stock by moving all cards to one or more "discard" or "foundation" piles.

Drinking card games

Drinking card games are drinking games using cards, in which the object in playing the game is either to drink or to force others to drink. Many games are ordinary card games with the establishment of "drinking rules"; President, for instance, is virtually identical to Daihinmin but with additional rules governing drinking. Poker can also be played using a number of drinks as the wager. Another game often played as a drinking game is Toepen, quite popular in the Netherlands. Some card games are designed specifically to be played as drinking games.

Compendium games 
Compendium games consist of a sequence of different contracts played in succession. A common pattern is for a number of reverse deals to be played, in which the aim is to avoid certain cards, followed by a final contract which is a domino-type game. Examples include: Barbu, Herzeln, Lorum and Rosbiratschka. In other games, such as Quodlibet and Rumpel, there is a range of widely varying contracts.

Collectible card games (CCGs)

Collectible card games (CCG) are proprietary playing card games. CCGs are games of strategy between two or more players. Each player has their own deck constructed from a very large pool of unique cards in the commercial market. The cards have different effects, costs, and art. New card sets are released periodically and sold as starter decks or booster packs. Obtaining the different cards makes the game a collectible card game, and cards are sold or traded on the secondary market. Magic: The Gathering, Pokémon, and Yu-Gi-Oh! are well-known collectible card games.

Living card games (LCGs)

Living card games (LCGs) are similar to collectible card games (CCGs), with their most distinguishing feature being a fixed distribution method, which breaks away from the traditional collectible card game format. While new cards for CCGs are usually sold in the form of starter decks or booster packs (the latter being often randomized), LCGs thrive on a model that requires players to acquire one core set in order to play the game, which players can further customize by acquiring extra sets or expansions featuring new content in the form of cards or scenarios. No randomization is involved in the process, thus players that get the same sets or expansions will get the exact same content. The term was popularized by Fantasy Flight Games (FFG) and mainly applies to its products, however some tabletop gaming companies can be seen using a very similar model.

Casino or gambling card games

These games revolve around wagers of money. Though virtually any game in which there are winning and losing outcomes can be wagered on, these games are specifically designed to make the betting process a strategic part of the game. Some of these games involve players betting against each other, such as poker, while in others, like blackjack, players wager against the house.

Poker games

Poker is a family of gambling games in which players bet into a pool, called the pot, the value of which changes as the game progresses that the value of the hand they carry will beat all others according to the ranking system. Variants largely differ on how cards are dealt and the methods by which players can improve a hand. For many reasons, including its age and its popularity among Western militaries, it is one of the most universally known card games in existence.

Other card games

Many other card games have been designed and published on a commercial or amateur basis. In some cases, the game uses the standard 52-card deck, but the object is unique. In Eleusis, for example, players play single cards, and are told whether the play was legal or illegal, in an attempt to discover the underlying rules made up by the dealer.

Most of these games however typically use a specially made deck of cards designed specifically for the game (or variations of it). The decks are thus usually proprietary, but may be created by the game's players. Uno, Phase 10, Set, and 1000 Blank White Cards are popular dedicated-deck card games; 1000 Blank White Cards is unique in that the cards for the game are designed by the players of the game while playing it; there is no commercially available deck advertised as such.

Simulation card games
A deck of either customised dedicated cards or a standard deck of playing cards with assigned meanings is used to simulate the actions of another activity, for example card football.

Fictional card games

Many games, including card games, are fabricated by science fiction authors and screenwriters to distance a culture depicted in the story from present-day Western culture. They are commonly used as filler to depict background activities in an atmosphere like a bar or rec room, but sometimes the drama revolves around the play of the game. Some of these games become real card games as the holder of the intellectual property develops and markets a suitable deck and ruleset for the game, while others lack sufficient descriptions of rules, or depend on cards or other hardware that are infeasible or physically impossible.

Typical structure of card games

Number and association of players

Any specific card game imposes restrictions on the number of players. The most significant dividing lines run between one-player games and two-player games, and between two-player games and multi-player games. Card games for one player are known as solitaire or patience card games. (See list of solitaire card games.) Generally speaking, they are in many ways special and atypical, although some of them have given rise to two- or multi-player games such as Spite and Malice.

In card games for two players, usually not all cards are distributed to the players, as they would otherwise have perfect information about the game state. Two-player games have always been immensely popular and include some of the most significant card games such as piquet, bezique, sixty-six, klaberjass, gin rummy and cribbage. Many multi-player games started as two-player games that were adapted to a greater number of players. For such adaptations a number of non-obvious choices must be made beginning with the choice of a game orientation.

One way of extending a two-player game to more players is by building two teams of equal size. A common case is four players in two fixed partnerships, sitting crosswise as in whist and contract bridge. Partners sit opposite to each other and cannot see each other's hands. If communication between the partners is allowed at all, then it is usually restricted to a specific list of permitted signs and signals. 17th-century French partnership games such as triomphe were special in that partners sat next to each other and were allowed to communicate freely so long as they did not exchange cards or play out of order.

Another way of extending a two-player game to more players is as a cut-throat or individual game, in which all players play for themselves, and win or lose alone. Most such card games are round games, i.e. they can be played by any number of players starting from two or three, so long as there are enough cards for all.

For some of the most interesting games such as ombre, tarot and skat, the associations between players change from hand to hand. Ultimately players all play on their own, but for each hand, some game mechanism divides the players into two teams. Most typically these are solo games, i.e. games in which one player becomes the soloist and has to achieve some objective against the others, who form a team and win or lose all their points jointly. But in games for more than three players, there may also be a mechanism that selects two players who then have to play against the others.

Direction of play
The players of a card game normally form a circle around a table or other space that can hold cards. The game orientation or direction of play, which is only relevant for three or more players, can be either clockwise or counterclockwise. It is the direction in which various roles in the game proceed. (In real-time card games, there may be no need for a direction of play.) Most regions have a traditional direction of play, such as:

 Counterclockwise in most of Asia and in Latin America.
 Clockwise in North America and Australia.

Europe is roughly divided into a clockwise area in the north and a counterclockwise area in the south. The boundary runs between England, Ireland, Netherlands, Germany, Austria (mostly), Slovakia, Ukraine and Russia (clockwise) and France, Switzerland, Spain, Italy, Slovenia, Balkans, Hungary, Romania, Bulgaria, Greece and Turkey (counterclockwise).

Games that originate in a region with a strong preference are often initially played in the original direction, even in regions that prefer the opposite direction. For games that have official rules and are played in tournaments, the direction of play is often prescribed in those rules.

Determining who deals
Most games have some form of asymmetry between players. The roles of players are normally expressed in terms of the dealer, i.e. the player whose task it is to shuffle the cards and distribute them to the players. Being the dealer can be a (minor or major) advantage or disadvantage, depending on the game. Therefore, after each played hand, the deal normally passes to the next player according to the game orientation.

As it can still be an advantage or disadvantage to be the first dealer, there are some standard methods for determining who is the first dealer. A common method is by cutting, which works as follows. One player shuffles the deck and places it on the table. Each player lifts a packet of cards from the top, reveals its bottom card, and returns it to the deck. The player who reveals the highest (or lowest) card becomes dealer. In the case of a tie, the process is repeated by the tied players. For some games such as whist this process of cutting is part of the official rules, and the hierarchy of cards for the purpose of cutting (which need not be the same as that used otherwise in the game) is also specified. But in general, any method can be used, such as tossing a coin in case of a two-player game, drawing cards until one player draws an ace, or rolling dice.

Hands, rounds and games

A hand is a unit of the game that begins with the dealer shuffling and dealing the cards as described below, and ends with the players scoring and the next dealer being determined. The set of cards that each player receives and holds in his or her hands is also known as that player's hand.

The hand is over when the players have finished playing their hands. Most often this occurs when one player (or all) has no cards left. The player who sits after the dealer in the direction of play is known as eldest hand (or in two-player games as elder hand) or forehand. A game round consists of as many hands as there are players. After each hand, the deal is passed on in the direction of play, i.e. the previous eldest hand becomes the new dealer. Normally players score points after each hand. A game may consist of a fixed number of rounds. Alternatively it can be played for a fixed number of points. In this case it is over with the hand in which a player reaches the target score.

Shuffling

Shuffling is the process of bringing the cards of a pack into a random order. There are a large number of techniques with various advantages and disadvantages. Riffle shuffling is a method in which the deck is divided into two roughly equal-sized halves that are bent and then released, so that the cards interlace. Repeating this process several times randomizes the deck well, but the method is harder to learn than some others and may damage the cards. The overhand shuffle and the Hindu shuffle are two techniques that work by taking batches of cards from the top of the deck and reassembling them in the opposite order. They are easier to learn but must be repeated more often. A method suitable for small children consists in spreading the cards on a large surface and moving them around before picking up the deck again. This is also the most common method for shuffling tiles such as dominoes.

For casino games that are played for large sums it is vital that the cards be properly randomized, but for many games this is less critical, and in fact player experience can suffer when the cards are shuffled too well. The official skat rules stipulate that the cards are shuffled well, but according to a decision of the German skat court, a one-handed player should ask another player to do the shuffling, rather than use a shuffling machine, as it would shuffle the cards too well. French belote rules go so far as to prescribe that the deck never be shuffled between hands.

Deal

The dealer takes all of the cards in the pack, arranges them so that they are in a uniform stack, and shuffles them. In strict play, the dealer then offers the deck to the previous player (in the sense of the game direction) for cutting. If the deal is clockwise, this is the player to the dealer's right; if counterclockwise, it is the player to the dealer's left. The invitation to cut is made by placing the pack, face downward, on the table near the player who is to cut: who then lifts the upper portion of the pack clear of the lower portion and places it alongside. (Normally the two portions have about equal size. Strict rules often indicate that each portion must contain a certain minimum number of cards, such as three or five.) The formerly lower portion is then replaced on top of the formerly upper portion. Instead of cutting, one may also knock on the deck to indicate that one trusts the dealer to have shuffled fairly.

The actual deal (distribution of cards) is done in the direction of play, beginning with eldest hand. The dealer holds the pack, face down, in one hand, and removes cards from the top of it with his or her other hand to distribute to the players, placing them face down on the table in front of the players to whom they are dealt. The cards may be dealt one at a time, or in batches of more than one card; and either the entire pack or a determined number of cards are dealt out. The undealt cards, if any, are left face down in the middle of the table, forming the stock (also called the talon, widow, skat or kitty depending on the game and region).

Throughout the shuffle, cut, and deal, the dealer should prevent the players from seeing the faces of any of the cards. The players should not try to see any of the faces. Should a player accidentally see a card, other than one's own, proper etiquette would be to admit this. It is also dishonest to try to see cards as they are dealt, or to take advantage of having seen a card. Should a card accidentally become exposed, (visible to all), any player can demand a redeal (all the cards are gathered up, and the shuffle, cut, and deal are repeated) or that the card be replaced randomly into the deck ("burning" it) and a replacement dealt from the top to the player who was to receive the revealed card.

When the deal is complete, all players pick up their cards, or "hand", and hold them in such a way that the faces can be seen by the holder of the cards but not the other players, or vice versa depending on the game. It is helpful to fan one's cards out so that if they have corner indices all their values can be seen at once. In most games, it is also useful to sort one's hand, rearranging the cards in a way appropriate to the game. For example, in a trick-taking game it may be easier to have all one's cards of the same suit together, whereas in a rummy game one might sort them by rank or by potential combinations.

Rules

A new card game starts in a small way, either as someone's invention, or as a modification of an existing game. Those playing it may agree to change the rules as they wish. The rules that they agree on become the "house rules" under which they play the game. A set of house rules may be accepted as valid by a group of players wherever they play, as it may also be accepted as governing all play within a particular house, café, or club.

When a game becomes sufficiently popular, so that people often play it with strangers, there is a need for a generally accepted set of rules. This need is often met when a particular set of house rules becomes generally recognized. For example, when Whist became popular in 18th-century England, players in the Portland Club agreed on a set of house rules for use on its premises. Players in some other clubs then agreed to follow the "Portland Club" rules, rather than go to the trouble of codifying and printing their own sets of rules. The Portland Club rules eventually became generally accepted throughout England and Western cultures.

There is nothing static or "official" about this process. For the majority of games, there is no one set of universal rules by which the game is played, and the most common ruleset is no more or less than that. Many widely played card games, such as Canasta and Pinochle, have no official regulating body. The most common ruleset is often determined by the most popular distribution of rulebooks for card games. Perhaps the original compilation of popular playing card games was collected by Edmund Hoyle, a self-made authority on many popular parlor games. The U.S. Playing Card Company now owns the eponymous Hoyle brand, and publishes a series of rulebooks for various families of card games that have largely standardized the games' rules in countries and languages where the rulebooks are widely distributed. However, players are free to, and often do, invent "house rules" to supplement or even largely replace the "standard" rules.

If there is a sense in which a card game can have an official set of rules, it is when that card game has an "official" governing body. For example, the rules of tournament bridge are governed by the World Bridge Federation, and by local bodies in various countries such as the American Contract Bridge League in the U.S., and the English Bridge Union in England. The rules of skat are governed by The International Skat Players Association and, in Germany,  by the Deutscher Skatverband which publishes the Skatordnung. The rules of French tarot are governed by the Fédération Française de Tarot. The rules of Schafkopf are laid down by the Schafkopfschule in Munich. Even in these cases, the rules must only be followed at games sanctioned by these governing bodies or where the tournament organisers specify them. Players in informal settings are free to implement agreed supplemental or substitute rules. For example, in Schafkopf there are numerous local variants sometimes known as "impure" Schafkopf and specified by assuming the official rules and describing the additions eg. "with Geier and Bettel, tariff 5/10 cents".

Rule infractions
An infraction is any action which is against the rules of the game, such as playing a card when it is not one's turn to play or the accidental exposure of a card, informally known as "bleeding."

In many official sets of rules for card games, the rules specifying the penalties for various infractions occupy more pages than the rules specifying how to play correctly. This is tedious but necessary for games that are played seriously. Players who intend to play a card game at a high level generally ensure before beginning that all agree on the penalties to be used. When playing privately, this will normally be a question of agreeing house rules. In a tournament, there will probably be a tournament director who will enforce the rules when required and arbitrate in cases of doubt.

If a player breaks the rules of a game deliberately, this is cheating. The rest of this section is therefore about accidental infractions, caused by ignorance, clumsiness, inattention, etc.

As the same game is played repeatedly among a group of players, precedents build up about how a particular infraction of the rules should be handled. For example, "Sheila just led a card when it wasn't her turn. Last week when Jo did that, we agreed ... etc." Sets of such precedents tend to become established among groups of players, and to be regarded as part of the house rules. Sets of house rules may become formalized, as described in the previous section. Therefore, for some games, there is a "proper" way of handling infractions of the rules. But for many games, without governing bodies, there is no standard way of handling infractions.

In many circumstances, there is no need for special rules dealing with what happens after an infraction. As a general principle, the person who broke a rule should not benefit from it, and the other players should not lose by it. An exception to this may be made in games with fixed partnerships, in which it may be felt that the partner(s) of the person who broke a rule should also not benefit. The penalty for an accidental infraction should be as mild as reasonable, consistent with there being a possible benefit to the person responsible.

Playing cards

The oldest surviving reference to the card game in world history is from the 9th century China, when the Collection of Miscellanea at Duyang, written by Tang-dynasty writer Su E, described Princess Tongchang (daughter of Emperor Yizong of Tang) playing the "leaf game" with members of the Wei clan (the family of the princess's husband) in 868 . The Song dynasty statesman and historian Ouyang Xiu has noted that paper playing cards arose in connection to an earlier development in the book format from scrolls to pages.

Playing cards first appeared in Europe in the last quarter of the 14th century. The earliest European references speak of a Saracen or Moorish game called naib, and in fact an almost complete Mamluk Egyptian deck of 52 cards in a distinct oriental design has survived from around the same time, with the four suits swords, polo sticks, cups and coins and the ranks king, governor, second governor, and ten to one.

The 1430s in Italy saw the invention of the tarot deck, a full Latin-suited deck augmented by suitless cards with painted motifs that played a special role as trumps. Tarot card games are still played with (subsets of) these decks in parts of Central Europe. In the 18th century the card images of the traditional Italian tarot decks became popular in cartomancy and evolved into "esoteric" decks used primarily for the purpose; today most tarot decks sold in North America are the occult type, and are closely associated with fortune telling. In Europe, "playing tarot" decks remain popular for games, and have evolved since the 18th century to use regional suits (spades, hearts, diamonds and clubs in France; leaves, hearts, bells and acorns in Germany) as well as other familiar aspects of the English-pattern pack such as corner card indices and "stamped" card symbols for non-court cards. Decks differ regionally based on the number of cards needed to play the games; the French tarot consists of the "full" 78 cards, while Germanic, Spanish and Italian Tarot variants remove certain values (usually low suited cards) from the deck, creating a deck with as few as 32 cards.

The French suits were introduced around 1480 and, in France, mostly replaced the earlier Latin suits of swords, clubs, cups and coins. (which are still common in Spanish- and Portuguese-speaking countries as well as in some northern regions of Italy) The suit symbols, being very simple and single-color, could be stamped onto the playing cards to create a deck, thus only requiring special full-color card art for the court cards. This drastically simplifies the production of a deck of cards versus the traditional Italian deck, which used unique full-color art for each card in the deck. The French suits became popular in English playing cards in the 16th century (despite historic animosity between France and England), and from there were introduced to British colonies including North America. The rise of Western culture has led to the near-universal popularity and availability of French-suited playing cards even in areas with their own regional card art.

In Japan, a distinct 48-card hanafuda deck is popular. It is derived from 16th-century Portuguese decks, after undergoing a long evolution driven by laws enacted by the Tokugawa shogunate attempting to ban the use of playing cards

The best-known deck internationally is the English pattern of the 52-card French deck, also called the International or Anglo-American pattern, used for such games as poker and contract bridge. It contains one card for each unique combination of thirteen ranks and the four French suits spades, hearts, diamonds, and clubs. The ranks (from highest to lowest in bridge and poker) are ace, king, queen, jack (or knave), and the numbers from ten down to two (or deuce). The trump cards and knight cards from the French playing tarot are not included.

Originally the term knave was more common than "jack"; the card had been called a jack as part of the terminology of All-Fours since the 17th century, but the word was considered vulgar. (Note the exclamation by Estella in Charles Dickens's novel Great Expectations: "He calls the knaves, Jacks, this boy!") However, because the card abbreviation for knave ("Kn") was so close to that of the king, it was very easy to confuse them, especially after suits and rankings were moved to the corners of the card in order to enable people to fan them in one hand and still see all the values. (The earliest known deck to place suits and rankings in the corner of the card is from 1693, but these cards did not become common until after 1864 when Hart reintroduced them along with the knave-to-jack change.) However, books of card games published in the third quarter of the 19th century evidently still referred to the "knave", and the term with this definition is still recognized in the United Kingdom.

In the 17th century, a French, five-trick, gambling game called Bête became popular and spread to Germany, where it was called La Bete and England where it was named Beast. It was a derivative of Triomphe and was the first card game in history to introduce the concept of bidding.

Chinese handmade mother-of-pearl gaming counters were used in scoring and bidding of card games in the West during the approximate period of 1700–1840. The gaming counters would bear an engraving such as a coat of arms or a monogram to identify a family or individual. Many of the gaming counters also depict Chinese scenes, flowers or animals. Queen Charlotte, wife of George III, is one prominent British individual who is known to have played with the Chinese gaming counters. Card games such as Ombre, Quadrille and Pope Joan were popular at the time and required counters for scoring. The production of counters declined after Whist, with its different scoring method, became the most popular card game in the West.

Based on the association of card games and gambling, Pope Benedict XIV banned card games on October 17, 1750.

See also

 Game of chance
 Game of skill
 R. F. Foster (games)
 Henry Jones (writer) who wrote under the pseudonym "Cavendish"
 John Scarne
 Dice game
 List of card games by number of cards

References

External links

 International Playing Card Society
 Rules for historic card games
 Collection of rules to many card games

 
Tabletop games